The Philippine Popular Music Festival (also known as Philpop) is an annual songwriting competition organized by the Philpop MusicFest Foundation and was launched in 2012. The creation of the festival was inspired by the defunct Metro Manila Popular Music Festival. The foundation itself is headed by the chairman Manny V. Pangilinan, executive director Ryan Cayabyab and administrator and communications director Patricia Bermudez-Hizon. The competition is only open to original and previously unreleased songs in English, Filipino and other Philippine languages. Since its inception, it has been airing annually in TV5.

There are three prizes given: Grand Prize (₱1,000,000), 2nd Prize (₱500,000) and 3rd Prize (₱250,000). An additional award is given named Smart People's Choice Award (₱200,000), which is the most popular song based on the text votes sent by the people. People who win these prizes also receive trophies while the defeated finalists each receive ₱50,000 and a plaque.

In its first year, the festival has received many controversies regarding to its finalists and its rules. On its second year, all the interpreters were able to film music videos for their respective song entries.

Viva Records released the compilation albums of the PhilPop Music Festival finalists.

In 2020, the Philpop Foundation formed a partnership with Warner Music Philippines and telecommunications company Smart Communications for its 2020 Edition of the competition.

1st Philippine Popular Music Festival
Date: July 14, 2012
Venue: Philippine International Convention Center, Pasay
Hosts: Ogie Alcasid and Nikki Gil

2nd Philippine Popular Music Festival
Date: July 20, 2013
Venue: Meralco Theater, Pasig
Hosts: Ogie Alcasid and Jasmine Curtis

Note:

 This song replaced Marion Aunor's entry, "Do, Do, Do", after Aunor backed out due to personal reasons and her talent management decision.

3rd Philippine Popular Music Festival
Date: July 26, 2014
Venue: Meralco Theater, Pasig
Hosts: Ogie Alcasid, Christian Bautista, Iya Villania, Jasmine Curtis and Tim Yap
Judges: Abra, Aiza Seguerra, Julie Anne San Jose, Megan Young, Sam Concepcion, Wilma Galvante and Noel Cabangon

4th Philippine Popular Music Festival
Date: 25 July 2015
Venue: Meralco Theater
Hosts: Mark Bautista, Sam Pinto-Semerad and Bela Padilla
Judges: Randy Estrellado, Paolo Valenciano, Quest, Karylle, Kris Lawrence, Louie Ocampo and Jett Pangan

5th Philippine Popular Music Festival
Out of more than 2,000 entries, The Philpop, together with the adjudicators — singers Basti Artadi, Bullet Dumas, Ebe Dancel, Lara Maigue and Davey Langit, academe members and college students — selects 12 entries for the competition. Five of the composers are returning to the competition, while 11 of those are rookies.

Date: July 23, 2016
Venue: Kia Theatre, Araneta Center, Quezon City
Judges: Adam Hurstfield, Christian Walden, Marcus Davis, Jr.
Hosts: Sam YG, Slick Rick, Toni Tony, and Bela Padilla

6th Philippine Popular Music Festival

The 30 semifinalists for the 2018 Philippine Popular Music Festival were announced on July 24, 2018. A criteria of 25% online streams, 25% SMS voting, and 50% judges' choices was used to select the top 10 finalists. The Top 10 were announced on October 17, 2018. The Grand Finals were held on December 2, 2018.

Top 30
Date: October 17, 2018
Venue: BGC Arts Center, Bonifacio Global City, Taguig

Top 10
Date: December 2, 2018
Venue: Capitol Commons
Judges: Ryan Cayabyab, Verb Del Rosario, Trina Belamide, Liza Diño-Seguerra, Randy Estrellado, Noel Cabangon, Paolo Guico

PhilPop 2020
The 2020 edition of PhilPop songwriting competition was announced in July 2020. Due to the restrictions on the COVID-19 pandemic affecting the music industry and the prohibition of live events, the competition was held online.

The top 15 entries were announced in September 2020, while the Grand Finals was held on December 12 via livestreaming on PhilPop's social media accounts.

References

Song contests
Music festivals in the Philippines
Philippine music awards
2012 establishments in the Philippines
Annual events in the Philippines
Music festivals established in 2012